Maplehurst is a town in Taylor County, Wisconsin, United States. The population was 359 at the 2000 census.

Geography
According to the United States Census Bureau, the town has a total area of 35.9 square miles (93.1 km2), of which, 35.9 square miles (93.0 km2) of it is land and 0.04 square miles (0.1 km2) of it (0.06%) is water.

History
The six mile square that would become Maplehurst was first surveyed in the summer of 1847 by a crew working for the U.S. government. Then in May 1854 another crew marked all the section corners in the township, moving on foot, measuring with chain and compass. When done, the deputy surveyor filed this general description:

Demographics
As of the census of 2000, there were 359 people, 133 households, and 98 families residing in the town. The population density was 10.0 people per square mile (3.9/km2). There were 144 housing units at an average density of 4.0 per square mile (1.5/km2). The racial makeup of the town was 97.77% White, 0.56% Native American, 0.28% Asian, and 1.39% from two or more races. Hispanic or Latino of any race were 1.67% of the population.

There were 133 households, out of which 34.6% had children under the age of 18 living with them, 59.4% were married couples living together, 9.0% had a female householder with no husband present, and 26.3% were non-families. 21.1% of all households were made up of individuals, and 9.8% had someone living alone who was 65 years of age or older. The average household size was 2.70 and the average family size was 3.14.

In the town, the population was spread out, with 28.4% under the age of 18, 8.4% from 18 to 24, 27.3% from 25 to 44, 25.3% from 45 to 64, and 10.6% who were 65 years of age or older. The median age was 35 years. For every 100 females, there were 118.9 males. For every 100 females age 18 and over, there were 108.9 males.

The median income for a household in the town was $29,375, and the median income for a family was $32,813. Males had a median income of $26,429 versus $20,000 for females. The per capita income for the town was $13,062. About 11.7% of families and 19.2% of the population were below the poverty line, including 26.4% of those under age 18 and 8.5% of those age 65 or over.

References

Towns in Taylor County, Wisconsin
Towns in Wisconsin